The Nine Mile River is a river in the Maitland Valley of southern Ontario, Canada, which flows through the village of Lucknow and empties into Lake Huron at Port Albert.

See also  
List of rivers of Ontario

External links
Maitland Valley Conservation Authority

Rivers of Bruce County
Tributaries of Lake Huron
Rivers of Huron County, Ontario